A ferrimagnetic material is a material that has populations of atoms with opposing magnetic moments, as in antiferromagnetism, but these moments are unequal in magnitude so a spontaneous magnetization remains. This can for example occur when the populations consist of different atoms or ions (such as Fe2+ and Fe3+).

Ferrimagnetism has often been confused with ferromagnetism. The oldest known magnetic substance, magnetite (Fe3O4), was classified as a ferromagnet before Louis Néel discovered ferrimagnetism in 1948. Since the discovery, numerous uses have been found for ferrimagnetic materials, such as hard drive platters and biomedical applications.

History 
Until the twentieth century, all naturally occurring magnetic substances were called ferromagnets. In 1936, Louis Néel published a paper proposing the existence of a new form of cooperative magnetism he called antiferromagnetism. While working with Mn2Sb, French physicist Charles Guillaud discovered that the current theories on magnetism were not adequate to explain the behavior of the material, and made a model to explain the behavior. In 1948, Néel published a paper about a third type of cooperative magnetism, based on the assumptions in Guillaud's model. He called it ferrimagnetism. In 1970, Néel was awarded for his work in magnetism with the Nobel Prize in Physics.

Physical origin 
Ferrimagnetism has the same physical origins as ferromagnetism and antiferromagnetism. In ferrimagnetic materials the magnetization is also caused by a combination of dipole-dipole interactions and exchange interactions resulting from the Pauli exclusion principle. The main difference is that in ferrimagnetic materials there are different types of atoms in the material's unit cell. An example of this can be seen in the figure on the right. Here the atoms with a smaller magnetic moment point in the opposite direction of the larger moments. This arrangement is similar to that present in antiferromagnetic materials, but in ferrimagnetic materials the net moment is nonzero because the opposed moments differ in magnitude.

Ferrimagnets have a critical temperature above which they become paramagnetic just as ferromagnets do.  At this temperature (called the Curie temperature) there is a second order phase transition and the system can no longer maintain a spontaneous magnetization. This is because at higher temperatures the thermal motion is strong enough that it exceeds the tendency of the dipoles to align.

Derivation 
There are various ways to describe ferrimagnets, the simplest of which is with mean-field theory. In mean-field theory the field acting on the atoms can be written as:

The following assumption then is:

For a diatomic lattice we can designate two types of sites, A and B. We can designate  the number of magnetic ions per unit volume,  the fraction of the magnetic ions on the A sites, and  the fraction on the B sites. This then gives:

For ferrimagnets, so it will be convenient to take  as a positive quantity and write the minus sign explicitly in front of it. For the total fields on A and B this then gives:

At last we will introduce the reduced magnetizations:

with  the spin of the ith element. This then gives for the fields:

The solutions to these equations (omitted here) are then given by

where  is the Brillouin function. Since . This then gives the following pair of equations:

Effects of temperature
Unlike ferromagnetism, the shapes of the magnetization curves of ferrimagnetism can take many different shapes depending on the strength of the interactions and the relative abundance of atoms. The most notable instances of this property are that the direction of magnetization can reverse while heating a ferrimagnetic material from absolute zero to its critical temperature, and that strength of magnetization can increase while heating a ferrimagnetic material to the critical temperature, both of which cannot occur for ferromagnetic materials. These temperature dependencies have also been experimentally observed in NiFe2/5Cr8/5O4 and Li1/2Fe5/4Ce5/4O4.

A temperature lower than the Curie temperature, but at which the opposing magnetic moments are equal (resulting in a net magnetic moment of zero) is called a magnetization compensation point. This compensation point is observed easily in garnets and rare-earth–transition-metal alloys (RE-TM). Furthermore, ferrimagnets may also have an angular momentum compensation point, at which the net angular momentum vanishes. This compensation point is a crucial point for achieving high speed magnetization reversal in magnetic memory devices.

Effect of external fields 

When ferrimagnets are exposed to an external magnetic field, they display what is called magnetic hysteresis, where magnetic behavior depends on the history of the magnet. They also exhibit a saturation magnetization ; this magnetization is reached when the external field is strong enough to make all the moments align in the same direction. When this point is reached, the magnetization cannot increase as there are no more moments to align. When the external field is removed, the magnetization of the ferrimagnet will not disappear but a nonzero magnetization will remain. This effect is often used in applications of magnets. This behavior results in what is called a hysteresis loop.

Properties and uses
Ferrimagnetic materials have high resistivity and have anisotropic properties. The anisotropy is actually induced by an external applied field. When this applied field aligns with the magnetic dipoles, it causes a net magnetic dipole moment and causes the magnetic dipoles to precess at a frequency controlled by the applied field, called Larmor or precession frequency. As a particular example, a microwave signal circularly polarized in the same direction as this precession strongly interacts with the magnetic dipole moments; when it is polarized in the opposite direction, the interaction is very low. When the interaction is strong, the microwave signal can pass through the material. This directional property is used in the construction of microwave devices like isolators, circulators, and gyrators. Ferrimagnetic materials are also used to produce optical isolators and circulators. Ferrimagnetic minerals in various rock types are used to study ancient geomagnetic properties of Earth and other planets. That field of study is known as paleomagnetism. In addition, it has been shown that ferrimagnets such as magnetite can be used for thermal energy storage.

Examples 
The oldest known magnetic material, magnetite, is a ferrimagnetic substance. The tetrahedral and octahedral sites of its crystal structure exhibit opposite spin. Other known ferrimagnetic materials include yttrium iron garnet (YIG); cubic ferrites composed of iron oxides with other elements such as aluminum, cobalt, nickel, manganese, and zinc; and hexagonal or spinel type ferrites, including Rhenium Ferrite, ReFe2O4, PbFe12O19 and BaFe12O19 and pyrrhotite, Fe1−xS.

Ferrimagnetism can also occur in single-molecule magnets. A classic example is a dodecanuclear manganese molecule with an effective spin S = 10 derived from antiferromagnetic interaction on Mn(IV) metal centers with Mn(III) and Mn(II) metal centers.

See also

References

External links

Magnetic ordering
Quantum phases